Lewis or Louis Stevenson may refer to:

Sportspeople
 Lewis Stevenson (Australian footballer) (born 1989), Australian rules footballer
 Lewis Stevenson (Scottish footballer) (born 1988), Scottish footballer
 Lewis Stevenson (rugby union) (born 1984), Irish rugby union player

Others
 Lewis Stevenson (politician) (1868–1929), American politician and member of the Stevenson political family
 B. W. Stevenson (born Louis Charles Stevenson; 1949–1988), American singer